Judges 19 is the nineteenth chapter of the Book of Judges in the Old Testament or the Hebrew Bible. According to Jewish tradition the book was attributed to the prophet Samuel, but modern scholars view it as part of the Deuteronomistic History, which spans in the books of Deuteronomy to 2 Kings, attributed to nationalistic and devotedly Yahwistic writers during the time of the reformer Judean king Josiah in 7th century BCE. This chapter records the activities of a Levite from Ephraim and his concubine, belonging to a section comprising Judges 17 to 21.

Text
This chapter was originally written in the Hebrew language. It is divided into 30 verses.

Textual witnesses

Some early manuscripts containing the text of this chapter in Hebrew are of the Masoretic Text tradition, which includes the Codex Cairensis (895), Aleppo Codex (10th century), and Codex Leningradensis (1008). Fragments containing parts of this chapter in Hebrew were found among the Dead Sea Scrolls including 4Q50 (4QJudg; 30 BCE–68 CE) with extant verses 5–7.

Extant ancient manuscripts of a translation into Koine Greek known as the Septuagint (originally was made in the last few centuries BCE) include Codex Vaticanus (B; B; 4th century) and Codex Alexandrinus (A; A; 5th century).

Analysis

Double Introduction and Double Conclusion
Chapters 17 to 21 contain the "Double Conclusion" of the Book of Judges and form a type of  inclusio together with their counterpart, the "Double Introduction", in chapters 1 to 3:6 as in the following structure of the whole book:
A. Foreign wars of subjugation with the ḥērem being applied (1:1–2:5)
B. Difficulties with foreign religious idols (2:6–3:6)
 Main part: the "cycles" section(3:7–16:31)
B'. Difficulties with domestic religious idols (17:1–18:31)
A'. Domestic wars with the ḥērem being applied (19:1–21:25)

There are similar parallels between the double introduction and the double conclusion as the following: 

 

The entire double conclusion is connected by the four-time repetition of a unique statement: twice in full at the beginning and the end of the double conclusion and twice in the center of the section as follows:

 A. In those days there was no king…
Every man did what right in his own eyes (17:6)
B. In those days there was no king… (18:1)
B'. In those days there was no king… (19:1)
 A'. In those days there was no king…
Every man did what right in his own eyes (21:25)

It also contains internal links:
Conclusion 1 (17:1–18:31): A Levite in Judah moving to the hill country of Ephraim and then on to Dan.
Conclusion 2 (19:1–21:25): A Levite in Ephraim looking for his concubine in Bethlehem in Judah.
Both sections end with a reference to Shiloh.

The Bethlehem Trilogy
Three sections of the Hebrew Bible (Old Testament) — Judges 17–18, Judges 19–21, Ruth 1–4 — form a trilogy with a link to the city Bethlehem of Judah and characterized by the repetitive unique statement:
"In those days there was no king in Israel; everyone did what was right in his own eyes"
(Judges 17:6; 18:1; 19:1; 21:25; cf. Ruth 1:1)
as in the following chart:

Chapters 19 to 21
The section comprising Judges 19:1-21:25 has a chiastic structure of five episodes as follows:
A. The Rape of the Concubine (19:1–30)
B. ḥērem ("holy war") of Benjamin (20:1–48)
C. Problem: The Oaths-Benjamin Threatened with Extinction (21:1–5)
B'. ḥērem ("holy war") of Jabesh Gilead (21:6–14)
A'. The Rape of the Daughters of Shiloh (21:15–25)

The rape of the daughters of Shiloh is the ironic counterpoint to the rape of the Levite's concubine, with the "daughter" motif linking the two stories ( and Judges 21:21), and the women becoming 'doorways leading into and out of war, sources of contention and reconciliation'.

The Levite's concubine (19:1–10)

The setting of the story, like in chapters 17–18, the travels of Levites who often relied on the 'local support and hospitality, having no patrilineal holdings of their own'. A particular Levite who resided in the mountains of Ephraim married a "concubine" (a lower status than "wife") from Bethlehem in Judah. The woman left him after 'she played the harlot towards him' (according to the Hebrew text; that is 'being disloyal but not necessarily adulterous') or NRSV renders: 'she became angry with him' (according to other manuscript traditions), going back to her father's house in Bethlehem. After four months the Levite traveled, accompanied by one servant and two donkeys, to visit and hope to win her back (verse 3; cf. Genesis 34:3). The woman brought into her house and his father-in-law received the Levite with full hospitality, even to persuade the guest to stay for four nights, a generosity that is emphasized by repetition in verses 4, 6, 8 and 5, 7, 8, 9. Finally, on the fifth morning the Levite left with his concubine and his servant, heading back north to the mountains of Ephraim (verse 10).

Verse 1
And it came to pass in those days, when there was no king in Israel, that there was a certain Levite staying in the remote mountains of Ephraim. He took for himself a concubine from Bethlehem in Judah. 
"A certain Levite": in Hebrew literally, "a man, a Levite".

Gibeah's crime (19:11–30)

As the first day of travel reaching the sunset, the Levite refused his servant's advice to stop in Jebus (later: Jerusalem), a non-Israelite town, but instead suggesting they stay at a town 'of the people Israel', Gibeah of Benjamin, ironically where the outrage would take place (verses 11–15). In Gibeah, the group did not receive the expected hospitality, ignored for a long time in the open square, until an elderly man finally invited them to his house (verses 16–21). Recalling a similar story about Lot in Sodom (Genesis 19), some "sons of Belial" ('base fellows', 'miscreants') came surrounding the house and demanded that the strangers be sent out to them so they might 'know them', a biblical euphemism for sexual intercourse (verses 22–26). As what Lot did, the host attempted to appease the wild men outside by offering them his "virgin daughters" l(cf. Genesis 19:8) and the Levite's concubine, but the people outside decline the offer. The Levite then acted,  throwing his concubine outside to the vicious mob and locked the door (verse 25–28; cf. Judges 20:6; in contrast to a divine intervention in Genesis 19:11). At the break of day, the victimized woman was let go, collapsing at the doorway. Later in the morning, the Levite opened the doors, ready to travel, finding the woman lying down in front of the door and giving crass and brusque orders to her to get up (verse 28). When the woman did not respond, the Levites simply placed her unconscious body on a donkey and continued the journey together. Upon returning home, the Levite cut the woman's body into twelve parts and sent each part to the twelve tribes of Israel, while asking for justice (verses 29–30, cf. 1 Samuel 11:5–8).

Verse 30
And so it was that all who saw it said, "No such deed has been done or seen from the day that the children of Israel came up from the land of Egypt until this day. Consider it, confer, and speak up!"
"Until this day": in the Greek Septuagint text of Codex Alexandrinus, this phrase is replaced by the following additional words: 
And he instructed the men whom he sent out, ‘Thus you will say to every male Israelite: "There has never been anything like this from the day the Israelites left Egypt till the present day."'

See also

Related Bible parts: Genesis 19, Judges 20, Judges 21

Notes

References

Sources

External links
 Jewish translations:
 Shoftim - Judges - Chapter 19 (Judaica Press). Hebrew text and English translation [with Rashi's commentary] at Chabad.org
 Christian translations:
 Online Bible at GospelHall.org (ESV, KJV, Darby, American Standard Version, Bible in Basic English)
 Judges chapter 19. Bible Gateway

19